Mireille is a French given name, derived from the Provençal Occitan name Mirèio (or Mirèlha in the classical norm of Occitan). It could be related to the Occitan verb mirar "to look, to admire" or to the given names Miriam "Myriam", Maria "Mary". It was almost never given to babies in France, except in families originating from Provence and around the Mediterranean sea. Notable people with the name include:

Mireille Balin (1909–1968), French actress
Mireille Chinain, marine scientist from French Polynesia
Mireille Darc (1938–2017), French model and actress
Mireille Delunsch (born 1962), French operatic soprano
Mireille Enos (born 1975), American actress
Mireille Gingras (born 1971), Canadian-American neurobiologist and entrepreneur
Mireille Guiliano (born 1946), French-American author
Mireille Hartuch (1906–1996), French singer and composer, known by the stage name "Mireille"
Mireille Johnston (1935–2000), French-American cook and author
Mireille Mathieu (born 1946), French singer
Mireille Nguimgo (born 1976), Cameroonian sprinter
Mireille Perrier (born 1959), French actress
Mireille Richard (born 1989), Swiss ski mountaineer
Mireille Robert (born 1963), French politician
Mireille Roccatti, Mexican scholar and jurist
Mireille Soria, American film producer

Fictional characters
Mireille, in the anime/manga series .hack//Legend of the Twilight
Mireille Belleau, the central character in the French language program French in Action, played by Valérie Allain
Mireille Bouquet, in the anime series Noir
Mireille Caquet, in the animated series Miraculous Ladybug

French feminine given names